Carlos Cores (April 19, 1923 – February 8, 2000) was an Argentine film actor, and film director.

Cores entered films in 1939 and starred in over 60 films between then and his retirement in the early 1980s. In 1968 he directed, acted and wrote Asalto a la Ciudad. He died in 2000, aged 76, in San Fernando, Buenos Aires.

Filmography

Director
La ruleta del Diablo/La ciudad de los cuervos (unpublished – 1968)
Lindor Covas, el cimarrón (1963)
Asalto en la ciudad (1961)

Writer
Lindor Covas, el cimarrón (1963)
Asalto en la ciudad (1961)

Actor
Yo maté a Facundo (1975) dir. Hugo del Carril.
La ruleta del diablo or La ciudad de los cuervos (unpublished 1968) dir. Carlos Cores.
Curse of the Stone Hand (1964) (Estados Unidos) dir. Carlos Hugo Christiansen y Jerry Warren.
Una excursión a los indios ranqueles (unfinished - 1965) dir. Derlis Beccaglia.
La fin del mundo (1963) dir. Emilio Vieyra.
Lindor Covas, el cimarrón (1963) dir. Carlos Cores.
Los culpables o Accidente 703 (1962) dir. José María Forqué.
Detrás de la mentira (1962) dir. Emilio Vieyra.
Mate Cosido (1962) dir. Goffredo Alessandrini.
Rumbos malditos (inédita - 1962) dir. Goffredo Alessandrini.
Asalto en la ciudad (1961) dir. Carlos Cores.
En busca de la muerte (1961) (México) dir. Zacarías Gómez Urquiza.
Male and Female Since Adam and Eve (1961) (United States) dir. Carlos Rinaldi.
Las canciones unidas (1960) (México) dir. Julio Bracho y Tito Davison.
Una canción para recordar (1960) (México) dir. Julio Bracho.
Vivir del cuento (1960) (México) dir. Rafael Baledón.
La mujer y la bestia (1959) (México) dir. Alfonso Corona Blake.
Mi mujer necesita marido (1959) (México) dir. Rolando Aguilar.
El diablo de vacaciones (unfinished - 1957) dir. Ferruccio Cerio.
Los tallos amargos (1956) dir. Fernando Ayala.
Sangre y acero (1956) dir. Lucas Demare.
El último perro (1955) (Narrator, unacredited) dir. Lucas Demare.
El juramento de Lagardere (1955) dir. León Klimovsky.
El amor nunca muere (1955) dir. Luis César Amadori.
El hombre que debía una muerte (1955) dir. Mario Soffici.
Guacho (1954) dir. Luis César Amadori.
El grito sagrado (1954) dir. Luis César Amadori.
Del otro lado del puente (1953) dir. Carlos Rinaldi.
La muerte en las calles (1952) dir. Leo Fleider.
La Parda Flora (1952) dir. León Klimovsky.
Enseñame a besar (1952) (México) dir. Tito Davison.
Paco the Elegant (1952) (México) dir. Adolfo Fernández Bustamante.
María Cristina (1951) (México) dir. Ramón Pereda.
 Women Without Tomorrow (1951) (México) dir. Tito Daviison.
Mi vida por la tuya (1951) dir. Roberto Gavaldón.
El ciclón del Caribe (1950) (México) dir. Ramón Pereda.
Curvas peligrosas (1950) (México) dir. Tito Davison.
La malcasada (1950) (México) dir. José Díaz Morales.
Nuestras vidas (1950) (México) dir. Ramón Peón.
Hipólito, el de Santa (1950) (México) dir. Fernando de Fuentes.
Hombres a precio (1949) dir. Bernardo Spoliansky.
La gran tentación (1948) dir. Ernesto Arancibia.
Tierras hechizadas (inédita - 1948) dir. Emilio Guerineau.
Siete para un secreto (1947) dir. Carlos Borcosque.
Esperanza (1946) dir. Francisco Mugica y Eduardo Boneo.
The Naked Angel (1946) dir. Carlos Hugo Christiansen.
The Lady of Death  (1946) dir. Carlos Hugo Christiansen.
La amarga verdad (1945) (Chile) dir. Carlos Borcosque.
Back in the Seventies (1945) dir. Francisco Mugica.
Éramos seis (1945) dir. Carlos Borcosque.
La juventud manda (1943) dir. Carlos Borcosque.
Valle negro (1943) dir. Carlos Borcosque.
Un nuevo amanecer (1942) dir. Carlos Borcosque.
Incertidumbre (1942) dir. Carlos Borcosque.
 (1942) dir. Luis César Amadori.
Cada hogar un mundo (1942) dir. Carlos Borcosque.
Yo conocí a esa mujer (1942) dir. Carlos Borcosque.
...Y mañana serán hombres (1939) dir. Carlos Borcosque.

External links
 

1923 births
2000 deaths
Argentine male film actors
Argentine film directors
People from Buenos Aires Province
20th-century Argentine male actors
Burials at La Chacarita Cemetery